P. C. C. & St. L. Railroad Freight Depot, also known as the Central Union Warehouse, was a historic freight depot located at Indianapolis, Marion County, Indiana.  It was built in 1916 by the Pittsburgh, Cincinnati, Chicago and St. Louis Railroad.  It was a one-story,  brick warehouse building measuring 790 feet long and 70 feet wide. It has been demolished.

It was listed on the National Register of Historic Places in 1995 and delisted in 1997.

References

Former National Register of Historic Places in Indiana
Railway stations on the National Register of Historic Places in Indiana
Buildings and structures completed in 1916
Buildings and structures in Indianapolis
National Register of Historic Places in Indianapolis
Transportation buildings and structures in Marion County, Indiana
Former railway stations in Indiana
Pittsburgh, Cincinnati, Chicago and St. Louis Railroad
Demolished railway stations in the United States